{{Infobox school
| name = Kitante Hill School
| image = 
| motto = seek knowledge and serve with integrity 
| established = 1960
| type = Public Middle School and High School (8-13)
| head_name = Principal
| head = 
| head_name2 = Elizabeth Onen| head2 = 
| city = Kampala 
| state = Kampala District
| country = Uganda
| students = 1,600+
| faculty =  
| athletics = Track, Tennis, Volleyball, Basketball and Golf
| mascot = 
| free_label = 
| website = 
}}Kitante Hill Senior Secondary School (KHSS), sometimes referred to as Kitante Hill School''', is a public, mixed, day school located in Kitante, a neighborhood in the city of Kampala, the capital and largest metropolitan area in Uganda. It caters to middle school grades (S1 to S4) and to high school grades (S5 to S6).

Location
Neighboring institutions include Kitante Primary School, a public elementary day school, and the Uganda Museum. The school can be accessed off of Acacia Avenue (John Babiiha Avenue), on Kololo Hill or off of Kira Road on Mulago Hill. The coordinates of the school are 0°20'02.4"N, 32°35'06.0"E (Latitude:0.3340; Longitude:32.5850).

Overview
KHSS was established in 1960 to cater for the children of civil servants in the about-to-be independent Uganda. It started with a population of 200 students and was limited to O-Level classes until 1986 when A-Level'' studies were introduced. Initially a boys-only school, it became co-ed in 1987. The student population in April 2014 exceeds 1,600.

Academics
The school teaches both science and liberal arts subjects.

Notable alumni
 Kiiza Besigye - Retired Colonel in the Uganda People's Defence Force. Former Presidential candidate in 2001, 2006,2011 and 2016.
 Moses Ssali - Musician also known as Bebe Cool
 Nicholas Tatambuka ("Nick Nola")  - singer and dancer. 
 Robert Kyagulanyi - Recording artist aka Bobi Wine
 Moses Muhangi - Boxer and president of the Uganda Boxing Federation

Notable faculty
 Jacqueline Mbabazi - Educator and politician. Taught science subjects at the school between 1976 and 1981.

See also
 Education in Uganda
 Kampala District

References

Kampala District
Educational institutions established in 1942
Mixed schools in Uganda
1942 establishments in Uganda